Micle is a Romanian surname. Notable people with the surname include:

George Micle (born 2001), Romanian footballer
Ștefan Micle (1820–1879), Romanian physicist and chemist
Veronica Micle (1850–1889), Romanian poet, wife of Ștefan

Romanian-language surnames